George Affleck (born October 15, 1964) is a Canadian-born businessman and politician.  He was an on-air host with the Canadian Broadcasting Corporation and an author before launching Curve Communications, a Vancouver-based public relations, marketing and communications agency. He is the president and CEO of the agency.  Between 2011 and 2018, he served as a Councillor in the City of Vancouver.  He was the BC Liberal candidate for Vancouver-Fairview in the 2020 provincial election.

Personal life

Affleck was born in  Vancouver, British Columbia and has 3 sisters
He attended Simon Fraser University in Vancouver, British Columbia studying business before taking an opportunity to work at Vancouver's Expo '86. He worked on a co-op in Israel's Negev Desert, took bets at a bookmaker's shop in England and bar-tended before returning to Vancouver to study English Literature at Simon Fraser University. He then studied journalism at Langara College and subsequently landed a job with the Canadian Broadcasting Corporation.

He has three children, two from his first marriage (Piers & Evelyn Affleck) and one with his partner, Amanda Bates (Marketing Executive) (Quinn A). They currently live in downtown Vancouver.

Career

Radio Host
(1991–1998) Affleck's career in Broadcast Journalism included a regular guest hosting spot on CBC's Saturday Show and Sunday Show, later renamed North-by-Northwest. He was a regular contributor to Definitely Not the Opera and a writer/broadcaster on the Early Edition, BC Almanac and The Afternoon Show.

Affleck was also a documentary producer for RadioSonic. He was a freelance feature reporter for CBC News and a producer for news and current affairs with CBC Radio in Vancouver. Affleck was also a music story producer on Realtime.

Author
Affleck wrote a historical anthology of the BC and Yukon Community Newspapers Associations' member newspapers. The book, called "Paper Trails", was published in 1999,
by Arch Communications.

His second book focused on marketing. Buzz: How to Grow Your Small Business Using Grassroots Marketing, was published in 2015.

Curve Communications
(2000–present) Launched with two colleagues (Laura Ballance and Duane Lennie), Curve Communications was launched after Affleck was given an assignment from the BC and Yukon Community Newspapers Association to assemble a historical anthology of its member newspapers. Following the success of the anthology (published in 1999), Curve Communications began taking additional clients (among them: Pacific National Exhibition and the Cloverdale Rodeo).

Over the next several years the business expanded until Lennie left the business leaving Affleck and Ballance as partners. In September 2008, Affleck and Ballance dissolve their partnership with Affleck keeping Curve and taking on the position of President and Chief Executive Officer. At this time (September 1, 2008) Curve Communications was ranked as the 63rd fastest growing company in British Columbia by Business In Vancouver (BIV Magazine).  As of January 2012, it is reported that Affleck owns more than 30% of Curve.

Politics
(2011–2018) Affleck successfully ran for political office in his home town of Vancouver in municipal elections held November 19, 2011. On November 15, 2014], Affleck was elected for his second term as a Councillor for the City of Vancouver under the Non-Partisan Association (NPA) party slate.

He retired from civic politics in 2018.

Affleck is now a regular political opinion contributor to The Orca.

In 2020, he ran with the British Columbia Liberal Party in Vancouver-Fairview as an MLA. He lost the election.

Notes

1964 births
Living people
British Columbia Liberal Party candidates in British Columbia provincial elections
Businesspeople from Vancouver
Langara College people
Non-Partisan Association councillors